An abatis, abattis, or abbattis is a field fortification consisting of an obstacle formed (in the modern era) of the branches of trees laid in a row, with the sharpened tops directed outwards, towards the enemy. The trees are usually interlaced or tied with wire. Abatis are used alone or in combination with wire entanglements and other obstacles.

In Slavic languages it is known as zaseka, a position behind sharpened objects.

History 

There is evidence it was used as early as the Roman Imperial period, and as recently as the American Civil War and the Anglo-Zulu War of 1879.

A classic use of an abatis was at the Battle of Carillon (1758) during the Seven Years' War. The 3,600 French troops defeated a massive army of 16,000 British and Colonial troops by fronting their defensive positions with an extremely dense abatis. The British found the defences almost impossible to breach and were forced to withdraw with some 2,600 casualties. Other uses of an abatis can be found at the Battle of the Chateauguay, 26 October 1813, when approximately 1,300 Canadian Voltigeurs, under the command of Charles-Michel de Salaberry, defeated an American corps of approximately 4,000 men, or at the Battle of Plattsburgh.

Construction 

An important weakness of abatis, in contrast to barbed wire, is that it can be destroyed by fire. Also, if laced together with rope instead of wire, the rope can be very quickly destroyed by such fires, after which the abatis can be quickly pulled apart by grappling hooks thrown from a safe distance.

An important advantage is that an improvised abatis can be quickly formed in forested areas. This can be done by simply cutting down a row of trees so that they fall with their tops toward the enemy. An alternative is to place explosives so as to blow the trees down.

Modern use 

Abatis are rarely seen nowadays, having been largely replaced by wire obstacles. However, it may be used as a replacement or supplement when barbed wire is in short supply. A form of giant abatis, using whole trees instead of branches, can be used as an improvised anti-tank obstacle.

Though rarely used by modern conventional military units, abatises are still officially maintained in United States Army and Marine Corps training.  Current US training instructs engineers or other constructors of such obstacles to fell trees, leaving a  stump, in such a manner as the trees fall interlocked pointing at a 45-degree angle towards the direction of approach of the enemy.  Furthermore, it is recommended that the trees remain connected to the stumps and the length of roadway covered be at least . US military maps record an abatis by use of an inverted "V" with a short line extending from it to the right.

See also 
Great Zasechnaya cherta

Notes

References

External links 
 Pamplin Historical Park & The National Museum of the Civil War Soldier includes large and authentic reproduction of abatis used in the U.S. Civil War.

Fortifications by type
Medieval defences